Georges-Claude Ngangue (born 7 October 1958) is a Cameroonian boxer. He competed in the men's welterweight event at the 1984 Summer Olympics.

References

1958 births
Living people
Cameroonian male boxers
Olympic boxers of Cameroon
Boxers at the 1984 Summer Olympics
Place of birth missing (living people)
Welterweight boxers
20th-century Cameroonian people